Isaac Dripps  (April 17, 1810 – December 28, 1892) was an American machinist and inventor. He worked on the locomotive John Bull and built seven locomotives. Dripps was a superintendent and partner of various railroad machinery shops. He has several patents to his name.

Early life 

Dripps was born in Belfast, Ireland on April 17, 1810. He came to the United States with his parents when a child. The family settled in Philadelphia.

Career 

Dripps became a machinist apprentice to steamboat machinery manufacturer Thomas Holloway of Philadelphia in 1826 at the age of sixteen. He became a foreman there when he was twenty years old in 1830. He was in charge of extensive repairs to the USS Swan in New York harbor in 1831 when he was twenty-one years old.

Dripps then was enticed by Robert Lewis Stevens, president of Camden & Amboy Railroad, to work for them. He was employed there from 1831–1853. He worked on the locomotive "John Bull" during that time.  In the fall of 1833 Dripps was made superintendent of the company's railroad machinery. He took charge of the company's shops and built seven locomotives at Hoboken, New Jersey.
 
Dripps was supervisor of overhauling the steamship "Commodore Stockton" afterwards renamed the "New Jersey" built in England by Captain John Ericsson in 1839. This boat had two screws, revolving in opposite directions to prevent listing of the boat. That function was mechanically complicated and troublesome. Dripps overhauled the boat in 1840. In the process he put in a simple engine and built a six-bladed single propeller screw that drove the boat for over two decades. He is thus credited with designing the propeller for the first commercially successful screw-propelled steamboat.

Dripps was a partner of the Trenton Locomotive & Machine Works at Trenton, New Jersey from 1853 to 1859.  In 1859 he was appointed superintendent of machinery of the Pittsburgh, Fort Wayne & Chicago railroad at Fort Wayne, Indiana. He built their state-of-the art railroad repair shops. When the Fort Wayne railroad was leased by the Pennsylvania Railroad Dripps was appointed inspector of all the company shops and machinery. In 1869 Dripps retired.

Family 

Dripps married in 1830. From this marriage there was 1 child, William. From 1878 until his death on December 28, 1892, Dripps resided with his son in Philadelphia.

Patents 

Dripps invented the first locomotive cowcatcher which the Camden and Amboy Railroad used in 1833. It was used on the John Bull railroad locomotive.
US78074A- Railroad car stove for heat, Patent No. 78074, dated May 19, 1868
US82810A – Improvement in railroad-oar, Patent No. 82810, dated October 6, 1868
US98675A – Railroad car truck, Patent No. 98675, dated January 11, 1870
US117753A – Improvement in railway journal-boxes, Patent No. 117753, dated August 8, 1871
US156455A – Improvement in railway-car trucks,  Patent No. 156455, dated November 3, 1874

Legacy 
Dripps conducted a series of tests in 1878 with different classes of locomotives on the mountain curves and grades near Renovo, Pennsylvania that resulted in the adoption of the Class R consolidation locomotive as the standard freight engine. Dripps was the first working locomotive engineer, the first railway master mechanic and the first superintendent of machinery of an American railroad.

References

Sources 

1810 births
1892 deaths
Irish emigrants to the United States (before 1923)
People from Philadelphia
American people in rail transportation
American railroad mechanical engineers
Locomotive builders and designers
Engineers from Pennsylvania